Skeidshovden Mountain is a mountain rising to 2,730 m at the southwest end of the Wohlthat Mountains in Queen Maud Land. It was first photographed from the air by the German Antarctic Expedition (1938–39). Mapped by Norwegian cartographers from surveys and air photos by the Norwegian Antarctic Expedition (1956–60) and named Skeidshovden.

Mountains of Queen Maud Land
Princess Astrid Coast